Clinics in Dermatology is a medical journal published for the International Academy of Cosmetic Dermatology by Elsevier, addressing clinical treatment and care of skin disorders. According to the Journal Citation Reports, the journal has a 2014 impact factor of 2.470.

References

External links

Dermatology journals
Elsevier academic journals
Publications established in 1983
Bimonthly journals
English-language journals